Leukemia & Lymphoma is a peer-reviewed medical journal published by Informa Healthcare. It covers basic and clinical aspects of hematologic malignancies (leukemias and lymphomas). The editors-in-chief are Aaron Polliack (Hadassah University Hospital), Koen Van Besien (Weill Cornell Medical Center), and John Seymour (Peter MacCallum Cancer Centre).

Abstracting and indexing 
The journal is abstracted and indexed in:

According to the Journal Citation Reports, the journal has a 2014 impact factor of 2.891.

References

External links 
 

Oncology journals
Publications established in 1979
Hematology journals
Monthly journals
Taylor & Francis academic journals
English-language journals